James Augustus Louis Hay (14 January 1881 – 4 February 1948) was a prominent New Zealand architect. He designed many new Art Deco buildings in Napier after the 1931 earthquake that had destroyed much of the town.

Early life
Louis was the eldest child and lived his early life in Lincoln, near Christchurch. In 1895, he moved with his family to Napier and attended Napier Boys' High School.

Career
After leaving school, Hay worked for Charles Tilleard Natusch's architectural practice. His later work is influenced by his time spent with Natusch and his interest in Frank Lloyd Wright, the Arts and Crafts Movement and Art Nouveau.

In the early part of the 20th century Hay setup his own practice doing mostly houses for wealthy Hawke's Bay residents. Although one of his best works was the National Tobacco Company building initially completed in the 1920s.

After the event of the Napier earthquake in 1931 where his wife was severely injured, Hay joined the Napier Reconstruction Committee. He helped ensure that local architects had control over the large rebuilding task instead of architects from other parts of the country.

Other Activities

In Napier he was known not only for his architecture but for his other interests including boat building, waterskiing, acting and playing the flute.

Noted works

1915 Otatara, Taradale
1922 Central Fire Station, Napier
1925 Civic Centre, Napier
1931 McLean Park Pumping Station, Napier
1932 Hildebrandt-Building, Napier
1933 National Tobacco Company building, Napier
1933 AMP Building, Napier
1935 Hawke's Bay Art Gallery and Museum, Napier
 Former Fire Chief's House
 St. Paul's Presbyterian Church, Napier
 Abbotts Building, Napier
 Parkers Chambers, Napier
 Louis Hay Building, Napier
 NZI-Building, Napier
 Napier Club, Napier
 Hairy Cactus Restaurant, Napier

References

Further reading
Shaw, Peter (1999): Louis Hay: Architect, Hawke's Bay Cultural Trust

1881 births
1948 deaths
New Zealand architects
Art Deco architects
People from Akaroa
People educated at Napier Boys' High School